Amorphoscelis singaporana is a species of praying mantis found in Singapore, India, Sumatra, and Indo-China (records from Cambodia, Thailand, Vietnam).

References

Amorphoscelis
Mantodea of Asia
Insects described in 1915